Tröger's base is a white solid tetracyclic organic compound. Tröger's base and its analogs are soluble in various organic solvents and strong acidic aqueous solutions due to their protonation. It is named after Julius Tröger, who first synthesized it in 1887.

History
Tröger's original research in 1887 failed to elaborate the exact structure of his new product that lead Johannes Wislicenus, the departmental director of the time, to assign a mediocre grade for Tröger's thesis. Though various possible structures had been drawn for Tröger's product, its correct structure remained as a mystery for 48 years, until the final elucidation in 1935 by Spielman.

Structure and chirality 

The nitrogen inversion normally leads to a rapid equilibrium between the enantiomers of chiral amines, that prevents them showing any optical activity. The inversion can be stopped by conformational strain as Tröger's base has demonstrated that nitrogen is capable of forming a stereogenic center in organic molecules. In Tröger's base, this inversion is not possible, and the nitrogen atoms are defined stereogenic centers. The separation of the enantiomers of Tröger's base was first accomplished by Vladimir Prelog in 1944. Prelog performed column chromatography using a chiral stationary phase as a relatively new method that later on gained popularity and became a standard procedure. Tröger's base and its analogs can be resolved by various methods including chiral HPLC or be made as a single enantiomer.

Almost 30 years after Tröger's initial report, Hünlich described another mysterious product obtained from the condensation of formaldehyde and 2,4-diaminotoluene. After almost a century the structure of Hünlich's product was elucidated by X-ray crystallography as a -symmetric amine-carrying analogue of Tröger's base. Tröger's base is a diamine, which exceptionally exhibits chirality due to the prevented inversion of configuration of two bridgehead stereogenic tertiary amine groups. Tröger's base and its analogs racemize under acidic conditions through the formation of iminium intermediates, that can be prevented by the replacement of methano-bridge with an ethano-bridge.

The molecule can be considered a molecular tweezer as the skeleton forces the molecule in a rigid locked conformation with the aromatic rings in 90 degree proximity.

Applications
Tröger's base and its analogs have been used as chiral discriminators for the recognition of a variety of organic compounds and as ligand in inorganic chemistry. When the methyl groups are replaced by interactive groups such as carboxylic acids or pyridine amide groups a host–guest chemistry interaction can take place between the Tröger's base and other molecules including glycosaminoglycans. It is found that the cavity dimensions are optimal for inclusion of suberic acid but that with a longer acid sebacic acid or a shorter acid adipic acid the interaction is less favorable. 
 
Chromophore carrying analogs of the Tröger's base have displayed unique NLO properties and can be used as molecular switches and liquid crystal dopants.

Synthesis

Tröger's base is of historic interest as was first synthesised in 1887 from p-toluidine and formaldehyde in an acidic solution by Julius Tröger. It can also be prepared with hydrochloric acid and dimethyl sulfoxide (DMSO) or hexamethylene tetraamine (HMTA) as formaldehyde replacement.

The reaction mechanism with DMSO as methylene donor for this reaction is similar to that of the Pummerer rearrangement. The interaction of DMSO and hydrochloric acid yields an electrophilic sulfenium ion that reacts with the aromatic amine in an electrophilic addition. Methanethiol is eliminated and the resulting imine reacts with a second amine. Sulfenium ion addition and elimination is repeated with the second amino group and the imine group reacts in an intramolecular electrophilic aromatic substitution reaction. Imine generation is repeated a third time and the reaction concludes with a second electrophilic substitution to the other aromat. Stereoselective, enantiospecific methods have also been introduced for the direct synthesis of optically active analogs of Tröger's base.

References 

Nitrogen heterocycles
Bridged heterocyclic compounds